Mehmet Çoban (1905–1969), aka Koç Çoban Mehmet, was a Turkish Olympian wrestler in the heavyweight division of Greco-Roman style.

He was born 1905 in Balıkesir, Ottoman Empire. A shepherd, he was discovered by the local military commander Hikmet Pasha during a Turkish traditional sport yağlı güreş (oil wrestling) match, and was sent to Istanbul to join "İstanbul Güreş İhtisas Kulübü", a renowned club specialized in wrestling. During his sport career from 1928 until his retirement in 1940, he was the only heavyweight wrestler of Turkey's national Greco-Roman wrestling team.

Mehmet Çoban became 5 times Balkan champion and earned also once the silver medal at the Balkan and the European Championships each. At his age of 41, Mehmet Çoban won a bronze medal at the European Championship. He participated at the 1928 and 1936 Olympics, ranking 8th and 4th respectively. Mehmet Çoban died in 1969.

References

External links

External links
 

1905 births
Sportspeople from Balıkesir
Olympic wrestlers of Turkey
Wrestlers at the 1928 Summer Olympics
Wrestlers at the 1936 Summer Olympics
Turkish male sport wrestlers
1969 deaths
20th-century Turkish people